Darian Lane is an American film writer, director, and producer, best known as an assistant director and producer of music videos and commercials. He has worked with Muhammad Ali, Beyonce, Black-Eyed Peas, Pharrell, Chris Brown, Audioslave, Nike, Reebok and IBM.

Lane was born in Philadelphia, Pennsylvania, and raised in Bethesda, Maryland. After he graduated from Arizona State University with a degree in communications, Lane moved to Los Angeles. 

In Los Angeles, Lane worked in an editing facility before working as a production assistant on music videos and commercials, and then as assistant director and producer. He began screenwriting and his first film, The Hitchhiking Game, was based on a Milan Kundera short story went to Cannes. His film The Collector, went to the NY/LA International and Malibu Film Festivals.

Darian Lane is the creator of the television series "CABARET", the beach volleyball reality show "AVP", and the uncredited creator of the tv series "Flesh & Bone" on Starz.

Lane has also written six published novels, "The Girlfriend Experience", "Invisible Sentence", "Flashy Fiction (series), "Hashtag" and True Hollywood Stories

References

External links

Producer Reel: https://www.youtube.com/watch?v=u1w4xTqdg64
Director Reel:  https://vimeo.com/53375421

 Tv show: Flesh and Bone (miniseries)
 Book: 
 Photo: 
 Theatre: 
 Photo: 
 AVP: 
 The Hitchhiking Game: 
 Cabaret: 
 Cabaret: 
 Flesh & Bone creator: 

 Theatre: 

American music video directors
Living people
Year of birth missing (living people)